Pick a Bigger Weapon is the fifth studio album by American hip hop group The Coup. It was released on Epitaph Records on April 25, 2006. It peaked at number 24 on the Billboard Heatseekers Albums chart, as well as number 35 on the Independent Albums chart.

Critical reception
At Metacritic, which assigns a weighted average score out of 100 to reviews from mainstream critics, the album received an average score of 78 based on 25 reviews, indicating "generally favorable reviews".

Rolling Stone named it the 49th best album of 2006. ThoughtCo placed it at number 9 on the "Best Rap Albums of 2006" list.

Track listing

Personnel
Credits adapted from liner notes.

The Coup
 Boots Riley – vocals, claps, drum programming, production, recording, mixing
 Pam the Funkstress – turntables

Additional musicians

 Michael Aaberg – synthesizer (1, 2, 3, 4, 5, 6, 7, 9, 10), piano (4, 5, 7, 11, 16, 17), clavinet (7, 10), organ (10, 17)
 Steve Wyreman – guitar (1)
 IRS – vocals (2)
 Moses Kremer – guitar (2)
 Uriah Duffy – bass guitar (2, 11, 15)
 Oslem Asina – vocals (3)
 Silk E – vocals (3, 15)
 Reginald Brown – vocals (3)
 Dawn-Elissa Fischer – vocals (3, 5)
 Dave Council – bass guitar (3, 4, 10, 14), piano (13, 14), synthesizer (14)
 James Henry – congas (3), percussion (4)
 Black Thought – vocals (4)
 Talib Kweli – vocals (4)
 Rod Gadson – vocals (4)
 Viveca Hawkins – vocals (4, 9)
 Eric McFadden – guitar (4, 9, 10, 11)
 David James – guitar (5, 11, 14)
 Damion Gallegos – guitar (5), claps (5), recording
 John Payne – bass guitar (5)
 Damion Masterson – harmonica (5)
 Ben Barnes – viola (5, 14, 15), violin (5, 14, 15), cello (14)
 Rebekah Raff – harp (5)
 Brian Collier – drums (5)
 Degi Simmons – congas (5, 10)
 Kween – vocals (6, 17)
 Lawrence "L" Wiley – vocals (6, 16)
 Elijah Baker – bass guitar (6, 7, 13, 17)
 Reggie B. – vocals (7)
 B'nai Rebelfront – guitar (7)
 Dawud Allah – vocals (8)
 Jordan Rode – vocals (8)
 Butch – vocals (9)
 Alina Hubbard-Riley – vocals (10)
 stic.man – vocals (10)
 Dawud Allah – vocals (12)
 Jordan Rode – vocals (12), recording
 Jello Biafra – vocals (12)
 Jubu Smith – guitar (13, 14, 16)
 Myron Glasper – vocals (13, 14)
 D'wayne Wiggins – guitar (15)
 Reginald Brown – vocals (16)
 Tom Morello – guitar (16)
 Vernon Hall – bass guitar (16)
 Q Jackson – cymbal (17)
 Cameron Hunt – guitar (17)
 Pete Ortega – saxophone (17)
 Isaac Tena – trumpet (17)
 Organized Elements – drum programming (17), production (17)

Technical personnel
 Matt Kelley – recording, mixing
 Kenneth Hung – cover art

Charts

References

External links
 

2006 albums
The Coup albums
Epitaph Records albums